TV5 News and Information, also known on-air as News5 (formerly ABC News and Public Affairs and TV5 News and Public Affairs), is the news and information programming division of the TV5 Network Inc..

News5 produces its news and information, infotainment, and lately entertainment content for free-to-air analog and digital channels TV5, One Sports and One PH, the flagship radio station Radyo5 owned and affiliate television and radio stations in the Philippines, the satellite channels One News and Colours, internationally through Kapatid Channel, AksyonTV International and media portal News5 Always On and InterAksyon (which recently absorbed to the PhilStar Group). It is headquartered at the TV5 Media Center, Reliance cor. Sheridan sts., Mandaluyong, Metro Manila, Philippines.

Firsts
News5 set a number of firsts in news reporting in the country. These include the use of Live-Pack and a virtual news set, the first news FM station (Radyo5 (Singko) 92.3 News FM) and, prior to December 2013, the first and only 24-hour Filipino language free TV news channel (AksyonTV) along with the first English-language business news channel (Bloomberg TV Philippines) since October 5, 2015, prior to its launching in full broadcast, which is owned by Bloomberg L.P. in partnership with Bloomberg Television and Cignal. It is also the first news organization to shoot and produce its newscasts in High Definition in April 2015 and the first digital (online)-only news video channel thru News5 Digital (formerly News5 Everywhere), which was launched on June 28, 2017.

Programs

Currently aired

TV5
 Frontline Pilipinas
 Frontline sa Umaga
 Frontline Tonight
 Rated Korina
 News5 Alerts

One Sports
 Basketball Science
 The Game

One PH
 One Balita Pilipinas
 One Balita Ngayon
 One Balita Weekend
 Radyo 5 Network News
 Rated Korina
 Sa Totoo Lang
 Ted Failon at DJ Chacha sa Radyo5

One News

Regional newscasts
 Frontline Eastern Visayas (TV5 Leyte)
 Dateline Zamboanga (TV5 Zamboanga)

Defunct programs

Defunct regional newscasts
 Aksyon Bisaya (TV5 Cebu)
 Aksyon Dabaw (TV5 Davao)

See also
ABC News Alert
TV5
One Sports
Radyo5 92.3 News FM
Nation Broadcasting Corporation
One News
One PH
List of programs broadcast by TV5
List of programs broadcast by One Sports
List of programs broadcast by Radyo5/One PH

References

External links
 TV5 website
 News5 Everywhere website